The Heavy Blinkers were a Canadian orchestrated-pop music group, from Halifax, Nova Scotia.  Their music is influenced by Brian Wilson, Serge Gainsbourg, Ennio Morricone, Paul McCartney and Harry Nilsson. They released six studio albums from 1998 to 2013.

History
The Heavy Blinkers were formed in 1998. Original members included Andrew Watt, singer Ruth Minnikin, and singer/songwriter Jason MacIsaac.

In 2000 the band released a self-titled EP. The style of the music has been compared to Brian Wilson's Smile project. The band released five albums, including 2004's The Night and I Are Still So Young. Their songs are published through Nettwerk Publishing. In January 2008, Watt and  Minnikin left the band, leaving MacIsaac as the only remaining original member.

In 2013, the Heavy Blinkers released their 16-song album, Health.  In 2014 the band was nominated for an East Coast Music Award for Pop Recording of the Year.

Discography
Hooray For Everything (Canada: Pleasant Street; 1998)
Heavy Blinkers (Canada: Brobdingnagan Records; 2000)
Better Weather (Canada: Brobdingnagian Records; 2002)
The Night and I Are Still So Young (Canada: Endearing Records; US: Cooking Vinyl; 2005)
 International Pop Exchange (split with Orwell) - EP (Endearing Records; 2005)
 Health (self released; 2013)

Contributions
Touch & Go (a Canadian film, provided the score) (2003)
Lynne Me Your Ears (2002) – "You Took My Breath Away"
Papa Nez: A Tribute to Michael Nesmith (2002) – "Magic"
G-Spot  (Canadian TV series) (2005) – "Silver Crown"
Robson Arms (Canadian TV series) (2005) – "Filtered Light"

See also

Music of Nova Scotia
List of bands from Canada

References

External links
 Heavy Blinkers official website

Musical groups established in 1998
Musical groups disestablished in 2013
Musical groups from Halifax, Nova Scotia
Canadian indie pop groups
1998 establishments in Nova Scotia
2013 disestablishments in Canada